Parrette is a surname. Notable people with the surname include:

Paul R. Parrette (1906–1980), American businessman
Vinx De'Jon Parrette (born 1957), American percussionist, singer, songwriter, and athlete

See also
Parrett (surname)
Parretti